Defending champions Nicholas Taylor and David Wagner defeated Johan Andersson and Peter Norfolk in the final, 6–1, 6–7(5–7), 6–3 to win the quad doubles wheelchair tennis title at the 2009 US Open.

The event was not held in 2008 due to a schedule conflict with the 2008 Summer Paralympics, an issue that would continue to affect US Open wheelchair tennis until 2021.

Main draw

Finals

References
 Draw

Wheelchair Quad Doubles
U.S. Open, 2009 Quad Doubles